Aerospace (or aeronautical) engineering can be studied at the bachelors, masters and Ph.D. levels in aerospace engineering departments at many universities, and in mechanical engineering departments at others.

Institution names are followed by accreditation where applicable.

Argentina 
 Universidad Nacional de Cordoba
 Universidad Nacional de La Plata
 Universidad Tecnológica Nacional, Facultad Regional Haedo
 Universidad Nacional de San Martín

Australia 
 Australian Defence Force Academy
 RMIT University
 Monash University
 University of Adelaide
 University of New South Wales
 University of Queensland
 Queensland University of Technology
 University of Sydney

Austria 
 FH Joanneum (Graz)
 FH Wiener Neustadt

Azerbaijan 
 Azerbaijan State Oil Academy
 Azerbaijan Technical University
 National Aviation Academy

Bangladesh 
 Bangabandhu Sheikh Mujibur Rahman Aviation and Aerospace University (BSMRAAU)
 Military Institute of Science and Technology (MIST)
 Bangladesh Air Force Academy (BAFA) (Bachelor in Aeronautics - Air force Personnel only)

Belgium
Von Karman Institute for Fluid Dynamics (VKI) /M.Res./
University of Liège (ULg) /M.Eng./
University of Leuven (KUL) /M.Eng./
Vrije Universiteit Brussel (VUB) /M.Eng./

Brazil 
In Brazil the B.Sc., M.Sc. and PhD degrees in Aerospace Engineering are offered by universities like: Universidade Federal de Santa Catarina – UFSC at Joinville campus, Universidade Federal do ABC – UFABC at Sao Bernardo do Campo campus, Universidade de São Paulo – USP at São Carlos campus, Instituto Tecnologico de Aeronautica – ITA, Universidade Federal de Minas Gerais – UFMG and Universidade de Brasília - UnB at Gama campus. The admission for these courses features among the most difficult in Brazil, partly due to its competitive Vestibular (similar to ACT and SAT in USA).

 University of Brasilia (UnB), Brasilia-DF
 Universidade Federal de Uberlândia (UFU), Uberlândia-MG
 Taubaté University (UNITAU), Taubaté-SP
 Instituto Nacional de Pesquisas Espaciais (INPE), São José dos Campos-SP (M.Sc. and PhD)
 Universidade do Vale do Paraíba (UNIVAP), São José dos Campos-SP
 Instituto Tecnológico de Aeronáutica (ITA), São José dos Campos-SP
 Universidade Federal de Minas Gerais (UFMG), Belo Horizonte-MG
 Universidade Federal do ABC (UFABC), Santo André-SP
 University of São Paulo's (USP) São Carlos School of Engineering (EESC), São Carlos-SP
 Universidade Federal de Itajubá (UNIFEI), Itajubá-MG
 Federal University of Santa Catarina (UFSC), Joinville-SC
 Fundação Mineira de Educação e Cultura (FUMEC), Belo Horizonte-MG
 Universidade Estadual Paulista "Júlio de Mesquita Filho" (UNESP) Câmpus de de São João da Boa Vista, São João da Boa Vista-SP
 Universidade Federal de Santa Maria (UFSM), Santa Maria, Rio Grande do Sul
 Pontifícia Universidade Católica de Minas Gerais (PUCMinas), Belo Horizonte-MG
 Universidade Federal do Maranhão (UFMA), São Luís (Maranhão)-MA

Bulgaria 
 Sofia University, Masters Programme in Space Technologies
 Technical University, Sofia, Masters Programme in Aerospace Engineering

Canada 
In Canada, undergraduate degrees in aerospace (or aeronautical) engineering can be earned at Carleton University, Concordia University, École Polytechnique de Montréal, the Royal Military College of Canada and Toronto Metropolitan University. Undergraduate aerospace engineering options, or related programs, are available through, McGill University, the University of Toronto, the University of Windsor, and the University of Manitoba. The Canadian Engineering Accreditation Board is responsible for accrediting undergraduate aerospace engineering programs, graduate study in aerospace engineering is also available at several Canadian post-secondary institutions, though Canadian post-graduate engineering programs do not require accreditation.

 Carleton University - B.Eng. (Aerospace Engineering), M.Eng., M.A.Sc. and Ph.D.
 Concordia University - B.Eng. (Aerospace Engineering), M.Eng. and Ph.D.
 École Polytechnique de Montréal - B.Ing. and M.Ing.
 École de Technologie Supérieure - B.Ing. (Mechanical Engineering), M.Ing. and Ph.D.
 Laval University - M.Sc. (Aerospace Engineering)
 McGill University - B.Eng. (Mechanical Engineering), M.Eng. and Ph.D.
 Royal Military College of Canada - B.Eng. (Aeronautical Engineering), M.Eng., M.A.Sc. and Ph.D.
 Toronto Metropolitan University - B.Eng. (Aerospace Engineering), M.Eng., M.A.Sc. and Ph.D.
 University of Manitoba - B.Sc. (Mechanical Engineering)
 Université de Sherbrooke - B.Ing. (Mechanical Engineering), M.Ing. (Aeronautical Engineering)
 University of Toronto - B.A.Sc. (Engineering Science with Aerospace Option), at the University of Toronto Institute for Aerospace Studies: M.Eng., M.A.Sc. and Ph.D.
 University of Windsor - B.A.Sc. (Mechanical Engineering with Aerospace Option)
 York University - B.A.Sc. (Space Engineering)
In Québec, École Polytechnique de Montréal, McGill University, Laval University, Université de Sherbrooke, Concordia University and École de Technologie Supérieure offer a joint program in the field of aeronautics and space technology leading to a M.Eng. (Aero).

Only undergraduate engineering programs in Canada are accredited, and this is done by the Canadian Engineering Accreditation Board.

Chile 
 Federico Santa María Technical University - Academia de Ciencias Aeronáuticas
 University of Concepción -

China 
 Beijing University of Aeronautics and Astronautics (北京航空航天大学)
 Beijing Institute of Technology (北京理工大学)
 Civil Aviation Flight University of China (中国民用航空飞行学院)
 Civil Aviation University of China (中国民航大学)
 Fudan University (复旦大学)
 Harbin Institute of Technology (哈尔滨工业大学)
 Nanchang Hangkong University (Nanchang University of Aeronautics) (南昌航空大学)
 Nanjing University of Aeronautics and Astronautics (南京航空航天大学)
 Northwestern Polytechnical University (西北工业大学)
 Shenyang Aerospace University (沈阳航空航天大学)
 Tsinghua University (清华大学)
 Xiamen University (厦门大学)

Colombia 
 Universidad Del Valle en Cali (Maestría en Ingeniería )
 Universidad Pontificia Bolivariana en Medellín
Universidad de Antioquia en Medellín

Croatia 
 University of Zagreb - Faculty of mechanical engineering and naval architecture

Czech Republic
 Brno University of Technology
 Czech Technical University in Prague

Egypt 
 Institute of Aviation Engineering and Technology
 Cairo University
 Zagazig University

Finland 
 Helsinki University of Technology

France 
List of public universities and engineering schools:
 CentraleSupélec
 École de l'air et de l'espace 
 École des mines d'Albi-Carmaux (IMT Mines Albi)
 École centrale de Lyon
 École nationale de l'aviation civile (ENAC)
 École nationale supérieure d'arts et métiers (ENSAM - Bordeaux)
 École nationale supérieure de mécanique et d'aérotechnique (ISAE-ENSMA)
 École polytechnique de l'université d'Orléans (Polytech Orléans)
 Institut national des sciences appliquées de Lyon (INSA Lyon)
 Institut supérieur de l'aéronautique et de l'espace (ISAE-SUPAERO)
 Institut supérieur de mécanique de Paris (SUPMECA)
 Paul Sabatier University, Toulouse
 University of Bordeaux (ENSPIMA)
List of private engineering schools:

 École d'ingénieurs des sciences aérospatiales (ELISA Aerospace)
 EPF School of Engineering
 ESME-Sudria
 École supérieure des techniques aéronautiques et de construction automobile (ESTACA)
 École supérieure des technologies industrielles avancées (ESTIA)
 Institut polytechnique des sciences avancées (IPSA)

Germany 
 FH Aachen
 RWTH Aachen University
 Technical University of Berlin
 University of Bremen
 Bremen University of Applied Sciences
 Technical University of Brunswick
 Technical University of Darmstadt
 Technical University of Applied Sciences Wildau
 Dresden University of Technology
 Technical University of Munich
 Munich University of Applied Sciences
 Bundeswehr University Munich
 University of Stuttgart
 University of Würzburg - Aerospace Informatics (B.Sc/M.Sc),  Satellite Technology (M.Sc.) 
 Hamburg University of Applied Sciences
 Technical University of Hamburg

Ghana 
 Kwame Nkrumah University of Science and Technology (BSc. in Aerospace Engineering)

Greece 
 University of Patras - Mechanical Engineering and Aeronautics
National and Kapodistrian University of Athens - Department of Aerospace Science and Technology

Hong Kong 
 The Hong Kong University of Science and Technology (香港科技大學)
 The Hong Kong Polytechnic University (香港理工大學)

Hungary 
 Budapest University of Technology and Economics

India
Aerospace (or aeronautical) engineering can be studied at the bachelor's, master's, and Ph.D. levels in aerospace engineering departments at many Indian universities, and in mechanical engineering departments at others. A few departments offer degrees in space-focused astronautical engineering. Aerospace (or aeronautical) engineering in India has a history even before the Independence of India.
 Indian Institute for Aeronautical Engineering & Information Technology
 Indian Institute of Science, Bangalore
 Indian Institute of Technology, Bombay
 Indian Institute of Technology, Kanpur
 Indian Institute of Technology, Madras
 Indian Institute of Technology, Kharagpur
 Anna University, Chennai
 Indian Institute of Space Science and Technology, Thiruvananthapuram
 Indian Institute of Engineering Science and Technology, Shibpur
Vellore Institute of Technology
Chandigarh University
Amrita School of Engineering, Coimbatore
 Manipal Institute of Technology
 Defence Institute of Advanced Technology
 Punjab Engineering College, Chandigarh
 Kalinga Institute of Industrial Technology (KIIT), Bhubaneshwar
 Birla Institute of Technology, Mesra
SRM Institute of Science and Technology, Chennai
Hindustan Institute of Technology and Science
Lovely Professional University, Phagwara
Karunya Institute of Technology and Sciences, Coimbatore
Graphic Era

Indonesia 
 Bandung Institute of Technology

Iran 
 Aerospace Research Institute
 Amirkabir University of Technology
 Ferdowsi University of Mashhad
 Imam Hossein University
 Islamic Azad University - Science and Research Branch
 K.N. Toosi University of Technology
 Malek-Ashtar University of Technology
 Sahand University of Technology
 Shahid Beheshti University
 Shahid Sattari Air University of Science and Technology
 Sharif University of Technology
 Tarbiat Modares University 
 Shiraz University of Technology
 University of Semnan
 University of Tabriz
 University of Tehran
 Urmia University of Technology

Iraq 
 University of Technology
 University of Baghdad

Ireland 
 University of Limerick

Israel 
 Technion - Israel Institute of Technology

Italy 
 University of Salento
 Polytechnic University of Milan
 Polytechnic University of Turin
 Sapienza University of Rome
 University of Campania Luigi Vanvitelli
 University of Bologna
 University of Naples Federico II
 University of Padua
 University of Palermo
 University of Pisa
 University of Roma Tre

Japan 
National University
 
 
 
 
 
 
 
 
 
 
Public University
 
 
Private University

Jordan 
 University of Jordan
 Jordan University of Science and Technology

Kenya
 Technical University of Kenya - DipTech (Avionics), DipTech (Airframes & Engine), BEng (Aeronautical Engineering)
 Kenyatta University - BSc (Aerospace Engineering)

Korea 
 Chang-Shin College
 Chonbuk National University
 Chosun University
 Chungnam National University
 Gyeongsang National University
 Hanseo University
 Inha University
 KAIST
 KonKuk University
 Korea Aerospace University
 Pusan National University
 Sejong University
 Seoul National University
 University of Ulsan

Latvia 
 Riga Technical University
 Transport and Telecommunication Institute

Lebanon 
 University of Balamand

Malaysia 
 International Islamic University Malaysia
 Universiti Putra Malaysia
 Universiti Sains Malaysia
 MARA University of Technology
 University of Kuala Lumpur, Malaysian Institute of Aviation Technology
 University Tun Hussein Onn Malaysia
 Nilai University College

Mexico 
 Instituto Politecnico Nacional (ESIME Ticoman)
 Universidad Autónoma de Chihuahua
 Universidad Autonoma de Nuevo Leon
 Instituto Politecnico Nacional (UPIIG Guanajuato)
 Universidad Autónoma de Ciudad Juárez
 Universidad Politécnica Metropolitana de Hidalgo
 Universidad Autonoma de Baja California

Morocco 
 Académie internationale Mohammed VI de l'aviation civile
 Université Internationale de Rabat

Myanmar 
Myanmar Aerospace Engineering University

Nepal 
Institute of Engineering

Netherlands 
 Delft University of Technology (TU Delft)
 Amsterdam University of Applied Sciences
 Inholland University of Applied Sciences

Nigeria 
 Nigerian College of Aviation Technology, Zaria
 Kwara State University, Malate, Kwara State.
 Afe Babalola University, Ekiti state

Norway 
 University of Tromsø

Pakistan 
Aerospace Engineering is a relatively new profession in Pakistan. Its scope is currently high  and expected to grow more in future. At present, many institutions offer degrees in Aerospace Engineering and related disciplines.

 Air University, Islamabad
 National University of Sciences and Technology, Islamabad
 Institute of Space Technology, Islamabad 8
College of Aeronautical Engineering

Paraguay 
 Universidad Nacional de Asunción

Perú 
 Universidad Alas Peruanas

Philippines 
 Ateneo de Davao University
 Air Link International Aviation College
 PATTS College of Aeronautics

Poland 
 Poznan University of Technology
 Rzeszów University of Technology
 Warsaw University of Technology
 Wrocław University of Science and Technology
 Military University of Technology in Warsaw
 Polish Air Force Academy in Dęblin
The Silesian University of Technology (SUT)

Portugal 
 IST - Instituto Superior Tecnico
 Universidade da Beira Interior
 Academia da Força Aérea

Russian Federation 
 Moscow Institute of Physics and Technology
 Bauman Moscow State Technical University
 Moscow Aviation Institute
 Samara State Aerospace University
 Moscow State Aviation Technological University (MATI)
 Moscow State Technical University of Civil Aviation (MSTUCA)
 Skolkovo Institute of Science and Technology (Skoltech)
 Saint Petersburg State University of Civil Aviation
 Siberian State Aerospace University
 Kazan Aviation Institute
 Ufa State Aviation Technical University
 Irkutsk State Technical University
 South Ural State University
 Saint Petersburg State University of Aerospace Instrumentation
 Voronezh State Technical University
 Omsk State Technical University
 Novosibirsk State Technical University
 Perm National Research Polytechnic University
 Orenburg State University
 Ulyanovsk State Technical University

Romania 
 Politehnica University of Bucharest
 Technical Military Academy of Bucharest
 Transilvania University of Brasov
 University of Craiova

Saudi Arabia 
 King Fahd University of Petroleum and Minerals - Aerospace engineering Department
 King Abdulaziz University - Aerospace  Engineering Department

Serbia 
 University of Belgrade, Faculty of Mechanical Engineering, Aerospace Engineer
 University of Belgrade, Faculty of Transport and Traffic Engineering, Air Transport Engineer (BSc), Master of Civil Aviation (MSc)

Singapore 
 National University of Singapore - Department of Mechanical Engineering
 Nanyang Technological University - School of Mechanical and Aerospace Engineering

Slovakia 
 Technical University of Košice, Faculty of Aeronautics, Bachelor/Master/PhD. postgraduate technical education

South Africa 
 University of the Witwatersrand (Wits), BSc(Eng) Aeronautical & MSc (Eng) Aeronautical (Aerospace)
 University of Pretoria (Tuks),BSc(Eng) Aeronautical

Spain 
 Universitat Politècnica de Catalunya
 Escola Tècnica Superior d'Enginyeries Industrial i Aeronàutica de Terrassa
 Escola d'Enginyeria de Telecomunicacions i Aeroespacial de Castelldefels EETAC
 Universidad de Sevilla
 Escuela Superior de Ingenieros
 Universidad Politecnica de València
 Escola Tècnica Superior d'Enginyeria del Disseny
 Universidad de León
 Escuela Superior Técnica de Ingeniería Industrial, Informática y Aeronáutica
 Universidad de Cádiz
 Universidad Politécnica de Madrid
 Escuela Técnica Superior de Ingeniería Aeronáutica y del Espacio
 Escuela Técnica Superior de Ingeniería Aeronáutica
 Escuela Universitaria de Ingeniería Técnica Aeronáutica
Universidad Europea de Madrid
 Escuela de Ingeniería del Espacio
Universidad Carlos III de Madrid
 Universidad Rey Juan Carlos
 Escuela Técnica Superior de Ingeniería de Telecomunicación
 Escuela Superior de Ingeniería
 Universidad Alfonso X el Sabio
 Escuela Politécnica Superior UAX

Sri Lanka 
 Asian Aviation Centre (Sri Lanka)
 General Sir John Kotelawala Defence University (KDU)

Sudan 
 Sudan University of Science and Technology, (Khartuom)
 Karary University, (Omdurman)

Sweden 
 Luleå University of Technology
 KTH Royal Institute of Technology
 Mälardalen University
 Linkoping University
 Scandinavian Academy of Aeronautics

Switzerland 
 ETH Zurich, Centre for Structure Technologies
 Zurich University of Applied Sciences/ZHAW BSc ZFH in Aviatik

Syria 
 University of Aleppo - Aerospace Engineering department.

Taiwan 
 National Cheng Kung University {NCKU} (國立成功大學) from East, Tainan, Taiwan similar to Purdue(Project Apollo/Saturn V/JSC/KSC), Caltech(JPL/NASA/SpaceX/Human mission to Mars), Georgia Tech(Hypersonic R&D/Model rocket), or ISAE-SUPAERO(ESA)
 National Formosa University {NFU} (國立虎尾科技大學) from Huwei, Yunlin County, Taiwan
 Tamkang University {TKU} (淡江大學) from Tamsui, New Taipei, Taiwan
 Feng Chia University {FCU} (逢甲大學) from Xitun, Taichung, Taiwan
 Chung-Cheng Institute of Technology {CCIT} (國防大學-理工學院) from Bade, Taoyuan, Taiwan also look at air transportation in Taiwan
 Chung-Shan Institute of Science and Technology {CSIST} (國家中山科學研究院) from Longtan, Taoyuan, Taiwan
 National Space Program Office {NSPO} (國家太空中心) from Hsinchu, Taiwan

Thailand 
 Assumption University
 Chulalongkorn University
 King Mongkut's University of Technology North Bangkok
 Kasetsart University
 Suranaree University of Technology

Turkey 
The Accreditation Board for Engineering and Technology (ABET) accredits two of the institutions offering aerospace (or aeronautical) engineering degrees in Turkey.
 Necmettin Erbakan University
 Anadolu University
 Erciyes University
 Istanbul Gelisim University
 Istanbul Technical University (ABET)
 Middle East Technical University (ABET)
 Turkish Air Force Academy
 Ondokuz Mayıs University
 Adana Science and Technology University
 Izmir University of Economics
 Tarsus University

Ukraine 
 National Aerospace University - Kharkiv aviation institute
 Oles Honchar Dnipropetrovsk National University
 National Technical University of Ukraine - Kyiv Polytechnic Institute
 National Aviation University

United Kingdom 
In the UK, aerospace (or aeronautical) engineering can be studied at the B.Eng., M.Eng., MSc. and Ph.D. levels at a number of universities. The first institution in the UK to teach in this field was Queen Mary, University of London, which, with the dissolution of the University of Paris (whose chair was founded at around the same time), maintains the longest continuous experience of doing so in the world. In 2017, The Complete University Guide rankings for the top ten undergraduate programs in the United Kingdom were: (1) University of Cambridge, (2) Imperial College London, (3) University of Bristol, (4) University of Bath, (5) University of Southampton, (6) Loughborough University, (7) University of Surrey, (8) University of Leeds, (9) University of Nottingham, and (10) University of Glasgow, where parentheses indicate the ranking. University of Cambridge and Imperial College London are consistently placed within the top 10 institutions offering undergraduate programs and research in aeronautical engineering, both being ranked within the top 10 in the world every year since 2013 by QS World University Rankings and Times Higher Education World University Rankings. The Department of Aeronautics at Imperial College London is noted for providing engineers for the Formula One industry, an industry that uses aerospace technology. Cranfield University is also known to produce the largest number of postgraduates in the UK with an aerospace engineering related degree.

 Ayr College Aerospace Engineering
 University of Bath Aerospace Engineering (MSc/MEng)
 University of Brighton Aeronautical Engineering (MEng/MSc)
 University of Bristol Aeronautical Engineering (MEng)
 Brunel University Aerospace Engineering (BEng/MEng)
 City University, London Aeronautical Engineering (MEng/BEng) Avionics (MEng/BEng)
 Coventry University
 Cranfield University
 Glyndŵr University
 University of Glamorgan (BEng/BSc)
 University of Glasgow Aeronautical Engineering or Avionics (BSc/BEng/MEng)
 University of Hertfordshire (BEng/MEng)
 Imperial College London (MEng)
 Kingston University Aerospace Engineering BSc (Hons), Aerospace Engineering, Astronautics & Space Technology MEng/BEng (Hons), Aerospace Engineering MEng/BEng (Hons)
 University of Leeds Aeronautical and Aerospace Engineering (BEng/MEng)
 University of Leicester Aerospace Engineering (BEng/MEng)
 University of Liverpool Aerospace Engineering (BEng/MEng)
 Loughborough University Aeronautical Engineering (BEng/MEng)
 University of Manchester (BEng/MEng)
 University of Nottingham Aerospace Engineering (MEng/BEng)
 Queen Mary, University of London Aerospace Engineering (MEng/BEng) 
 Queen's University Belfast Aerospace Engineering (MEng/BEng)
 University of Salford Aeronautical (aerospace) Engineering (BEng/BSc/MEng/MSc)
 University of Sheffield Aerospace Engineering (MEng)  Aerospace Materials (MSc)
 University of Southampton
 Staffordshire University  MSc Aeronautical Engineering and BSc (Hons) Aeronautical Technology
 University of Strathclyde BEng (Hons)/MEng Aero-Mechanical Engineering and MEng Mechanical Engineering with Aeronautics
 University of Surrey Aeronautical (aerospace) Engineering (BEng/BSc/MEng/MSc)
 University of Swansea Aerospace Engineering (BEng/MEng/MSc)
 University of the West of England Aerospace Engineering (BEng/MEng)
 University of the West of Scotland Aircraft Engineering (BEng (Hons)/MSc)
 University of the Highlands and Islands Aircraft Engineering (BEng (Hons)/MSc)

United States 
Aerospace (or aeronautical) engineering can be studied at the advanced diploma, bachelor's, master's, and Ph.D. levels in aerospace engineering departments at many U.S. universities, and in mechanical engineering departments at others. A few departments offer degrees in space-focused astronautical engineering.

In 2015, the U.S. News & World Report rankings for the top ten undergraduate programs were: (1) Massachusetts Institute of Technology, (2) Georgia Institute of Technology, (3) University of Michigan, (4) Purdue University, (5) California Institute of Technology, (6) Stanford University, (7) Princeton University, (8) University of Illinois at Urbana–Champaign, (9) University of Maryland, College Park, and (10) University of Colorado at Boulder, [10] University of Texas, Austin, where parentheses indicate the ranking, and same number indicates a tie in scores.

In 2016, the U.S. News & World Report rankings for the top ten graduate programs were: (1) Massachusetts Institute of Technology, (2) Georgia Institute of Technology, (2) Stanford University, (4) University of Michigan, (4) California Institute of Technology, (6) Purdue University, (7) University of Texas at Austin, (8) University of Illinois at Urbana–Champaign, (8) University of Colorado at Boulder, (10) Texas A&M University, (10) University of Maryland, College Park, where parenthesis indicate the ranking and the same number indicates a tie in scores.

The Accreditation Board for Engineering and Technology (ABET) accredits almost all of the institutions offering aerospace (or aeronautical) engineering degrees in the United States.

 Air Force Institute of Technology (ABET)
 Arizona State University (ABET)
 Auburn University (ABET)
 Boston University (ABET)
 California Institute of Technology
 California Polytechnic State University, San Luis Obispo (ABET)
 California State Polytechnic University, Pomona (ABET)
 California State University, Long Beach (ABET)
 Case Western Reserve University (ABET)
 Capitol Technology University (ABET)
 Clarkson University (ABET)
 Cornell University (ABET)
 Embry–Riddle Aeronautical University
 Daytona Beach campus (ABET)
 Prescott campus (ABET)
 Worldwide campus (ABET)
 Florida Institute of Technology (ABET)
 Georgia Institute of Technology (ABET)
 Illinois Institute of Technology (ABET)
 Iowa State University (ABET)
 LeTourneau University (ABET)
 Massachusetts Institute of Technology (ABET)
 Mississippi State University (ABET)
 Missouri University of Science and Technology (ABET)
 Montana State University (only minor's degree program is offered) (ABET)
 Naval Postgraduate School (ABET)
 New Mexico State University (ABET)
 North Carolina State University (ABET)
 Ohio State University (ABET)
 Oklahoma State University (ABET)
 Pennsylvania State University (ABET)
 Polytechnic Institute of New York University (ABET)
 Princeton University (ABET)
 Purdue University (ABET)
 Rensselaer Polytechnic Institute (ABET)
 Rutgers University (ABET)
 Saint Louis University (ABET)
 San Diego State University (ABET)
 San Jose State University (ABET)
 Southern New Hampshire University (ABET)
 Stanford University
 Syracuse University (ABET)
 Texas A&M University (ABET)
 Tuskegee University (ABET)
 United States Air Force Academy (ABET)
 United States Naval Academy (ABET)
 University at Buffalo, The State University of New York (ABET)
 University of Alabama in Huntsville (ABET)
 University of Alabama (ABET)
 University of Alaska Fairbanks (only minor's degree program and master's certificate are offered)
University of Arizona (ABET)
 University of California, Davis (ABET)
 University of California, Irvine (ABET)
 University of California, Los Angeles (ABET)
 University of California, San Diego (ABET)
 University of Central Florida (ABET)
 University of Cincinnati (ABET)
 University of Colorado at Boulder (ABET)
 University of Florida (ABET)
 University of Illinois at Urbana–Champaign (ABET)
 University of Kansas (ABET)
 University of Maryland, College Park (ABET)
 University of Miami (ABET)
 University of Michigan (ABET)
 University of Minnesota (ABET)
 University of Missouri (ABET)
 University of Nevada, Las Vegas (only master's degree program is offered) (ABET)
 University of Notre Dame (ABET)
 University of Oklahoma (ABET)
 University of Southern California (ABET)
 University of South Carolina
 University of Tennessee at Knoxville (ABET)
 University of Tennessee Space Institute
 University of Texas at Arlington (ABET)
 University of Texas at Austin (ABET)
 University of Virginia (ABET)
 University of Washington (ABET)
 Utah State University (ABET)
 Virginia Polytechnic Institute and State University (ABET)
 Washington University in St. Louis
 West Virginia University (ABET)
 Western Michigan University (ABET)
 Wichita State University (ABET)
 Worcester Polytechnic Institute (ABET)

Venezuela 
 National Experimental Polytechnic University of the Armed Force (UNEFA) - Aeronautical Engineering

Vietnam 
  (DAA) - Aeronautical Engineering
 Hanoi University of Science and Technology (HUST)
 Ho Chi Minh City University of Technology (HCMUT)
 Da Nang University of Technology
 Le Quy Don Technical University (LeTech)
 University of Science and Technology of Hanoi (USTH)
  (UET, VNU)
 
 Vietnam Aviation Academy (VAA)
 Aviation Service Vocational College (Airserco)

References 

Aerospace engineering organizations
Sc
Lists of universities and colleges
Lists of engineering schools